Jim Webb (born ) was one of the founding members of the New Brunswick Confederation of Regions Party, a conservative political party in New Brunswick, Canada.

Webb served as its leader during the 1999 election campaign, and later founded the Grey Party of New Brunswick, serving as its only leader during its brief existence.

References

Candidates in New Brunswick provincial elections
New Brunswick political party leaders
Living people
New Brunswick Confederation of Regions Party politicians
Grey Party of Canada politicians
Year of birth missing (living people)